Scopula annexata is a moth of the family Geometridae. It was described by Prout in 1938. It is found in India (Nilgiris).

References

Moths described in 1938
annexata
Moths of Asia
Taxa named by Louis Beethoven Prout